Uday Saddam Hussein (18 June 1964 – 22 July 2003) was an Iraqi politician and the eldest son of Saddam Hussein. He held numerous positions as a sports chairman, military officer and businessman, and was the head of the Iraqi Olympic Committee and Iraq Football Association, and head of the Fedayeen Saddam.

Uday Hussein was born in Baghdad. He was the eldest child of Iraqi president Saddam Hussein and his first wife and cousin, Sajida Talfah. Uday was seen for several years as the likely successor to his father but lost the place as heir apparent to his younger brother, Qusay, due to injuries in an assassination attempt. Following the United States-led invasion of Iraq in 2003, he was killed alongside Qusay and his nephew Mustafa by an American task force after a prolonged gunfight in Mosul.

Uday was reportedly erratically ruthless and intimidating to perceived adversaries as well as to close friends. Family relatives and personal acquaintances were often victims of his violence and rage. Witness allegations have suggested he was guilty of rape, murder, and torture, including the arrest and torture of Iraqi Olympic athletes and members of the national football team whenever they lost a match.

Early life and education 
Uday Saddam Hussein Al Tikriti was born in Al-Karkh, Baghdad to Saddam Hussein and Sajida Talfah while his father was in prison. Multiple sources give different birthdays; although official sources give an 18 June 1964 birth, The Independent gave a birth date of 9 March 1964, while others give a 1965 birth. One source gave it as early as 1963. He was rumored to have played with disarmed grenades as an infant. As a child, he and his younger brother Qusay would witness executions with their father.

Uday attended al-Mansour school in Baghdad in the 1970s. One of his former teachers was Dinah Bentley, an English teacher from Yorkshire who married an Iraqi and briefly taught at the school. Uday was reportedly driven to school by a chauffeur in a Mercedes-Benz and surrounded by servants. He picked up his English teacher's Yorkshire accent and was described as a cheerful, bright child who was responsive to discipline, but an average student who struggled to concentrate.

He was alleged to have committed his first killing as a 16 year old against his teacher who chastised him in front of his girlfriend. He started his university studies at Baghdad Medical College, where he only stayed for three days. Then he moved to the College of Engineering, and obtained a Bachelor of Engineering from the University of Baghdad. He wrote his master's thesis on "Iraqi military strategy during the eight-year Iran-Iraq war". He obtained a doctorate in political science from the University of Baghdad in 1998 and the title of his thesis was "The world after the Cold War", where he predicted the United States would no longer be a world power in 2015. Some have argued that Uday did not have academic abilities and his theses were written by others in exchange for money and gifts, and no one was able to give Uday a low score out of fear. "He was really smart, probably smarter than his father—but he was crazy," said one of his classmates about Uday.

Tortures of Iraqi Athletes 

In 1984, after graduating university, Saddam appointed Uday chairman of the Iraqi Olympic Committee and the Iraq Football Association. In the former role, he tortured athletes who failed to win. Latif Yahia, who claims to have been Uday's body double, said, "The word that defines him is sadistic. I think Saddam Hussein was more human than Uday. The Olympic Committee was not a sports center, it was Uday's world".

Raed Ahmed, one of the Iraqi athletes who escaped, stated: "During training, he would watch all the athletes closely, and put pressure on the coaches to push the athletes even more. If he was not happy with the results, he would have coaches and athletes put in his private prison in the Olympic Committee building. The punishment was Uday's private prison where they tortured people. Some athletes, including the best ones, started quitting the sport once Uday took over the Committee. "I always managed not to be punished. I made sure not to promise anything. There is a strong possibility of always being beaten. But when I won, Uday would be very happy." In 2005, an interrogation video of Uday was revealed while questioning Raed's family. Uday met the father of the fugitive Iraqi Rab'a as well as his mother, Laila Hassoun, as Uday urged them to ask about their son's wife, and despite that, Uday did not suffer the usual harm to the father and mother of the fugitive Iraqi Rab'a for a simple reason, which is that Uday himself was the guarantor of the fugitive Rab'a and his relatives did not sponsor him. That day, the Iraqi authorities stipulate that whoever travels in an official delegation must guarantee his relatives' return. Uday focused upon his meeting with the relatives of the defective athlete on their question to which region they belong, when Uday asked the Iraqi athlete's father about his description of what his son did, the father said this was wrong. Uday responded angrily, saying "This is a shame, not a mistake." According to the father and mother's account, Uday ordered the filming to stop and told them that they had to bring the wife of the fugitive athlete, otherwise, he would "cut your heads". Then they said that they were transported by car to a prison where they remained for 16 days in extremely poor conditions.

Ammo Baba, who coached teams who won 18 tournaments and participated thrice in the Olympic Games, said the punishment that Uday imposed on the players had destroyed their athletic abilities. Baba noted that half of the Iraqi athletes had left the country, and many of them pretended to be sick before the games against strong competitors. Baba said that Uday had destroyed the national team, adding that they played worse after being arrested. Baba said he told his friends that if he died suddenly, they would know the reason. However, some people claim that these stories are exaggerated. Maad Ibrahim Hamid, assistant coach of the national football team, said that Uday was giving the players financial rewards for victory and threatening them with imprisonment in the event of defeat. Hamid said that the athletes were not subjected to torture, but some were arrested for immoral behaviour, including adultery and addiction to alcohol, as well as for playing poorly. Ahmed Radhi, one of the most famous football players in Iraq, said that after he was not willing to join the newly-founded Al-Rasheed club, he was kidnapped at midnight by Uday's men, beaten and accused of harassment. Then, he accepted Uday's offer because of death threats. Another Iraqi international footballer, Saad Qais, said that Uday was angry with him because he was sent off in a match against Turkmenistan in 1997. The "discipline" operation was carried out by jailers known as "teachers" in a closed section of the Radwaniyah detention facility for athletes and journalists. He said, "Uday established the Rashid team and forced the best Iraqi players to play in it, and forced me to leave my beloved team, and he honored us with gifts after every win, but he also punished us after every loss."

Murder of Kamel Hana Gegeo 
Although his status as Saddam's elder son made him Saddam's prospective successor, Uday fell out of favour with his father. In October 1988, at a party in honour of Suzanne Mubarak, wife of Egyptian President Hosni Mubarak, Uday murdered his father's personal valet and food taster, Kamel Hana Gegeo, possibly at the request of his mother. Before an assemblage of horrified guests, an intoxicated Uday bludgeoned Gegeo and repeatedly stabbed him with an electric carving knife. Gegeo had recently introduced Saddam to a younger woman, Samira Shahbandar, who had become Saddam's second wife in 1986. Uday considered his father's relationship with Shahbandar an insult to his mother. Shahbandar's oldest son fled to Jordan because of the harassment by Uday after the marriage. He also may have feared losing succession to Gegeo, whose loyalty to Saddam Hussein was unquestioned.

As punishment for the murder, Saddam briefly imprisoned Uday. Once released, Uday was sent to Switzerland to act as the assistant to the Iraqi ambassador there. He was expelled by the Swiss government in 1990, after he was repeatedly arrested for fighting. According to Jalopnik, Uday's vast car collections were burned by his father after the Kamel Hana Gegeo incident.

Others describe the murder as follows: Next to the palace where Suzanne Mubarak and Uday's mother were staying, Kamel Hana was celebrating the wedding of a relative and firing in the air, so Uday sent his men and asked them not to bother the two women. During the discussion, Uday hit Kamel's head with his walking stick, causing Kamel's death. Uday, afraid of his father's reaction, tried to commit suicide and was taken to the hospital. He escaped from the hospital, set up a barricade around his home, and fired at anyone trying to enter his home. He surrendered with the persuasion of his brother Qusay.

According to the memory of Uday's step-uncle Barzan, after escaping from the hospital he went to his father's palace and told him to "stay with your real wife". Then Saddam said to Barzan, "He was lucky because I had no weapon with me." But Uday later came to the door of the palace again and told Barzan that he intended to shoot his father. He fired at his brother Qusay and at step-uncles who were trying to prevent him from doing so. Later, under the guidance of Barzan, Uday apologized to his father. His father ordered him to surrender. When his brothers-in-law Hussein Kamel and Saddam Kamel learned that he was trying to escape to the United States, he was arrested on his father's orders, but released three weeks later. After the incident, Uday attacked two people whom he thought were informers. At the request of Saddam, Uday was sent out of Iraq under the control of Barzan to Switzerland in order to get rid of the disgrace caused by Uday.

Muhammad Asim Shanshal, head of the private office of Uday, said, "After a call from his mother, Sajida, told him that Kamel Hanna holds a joyful party for Saddam's second wife, Samira Shahbandar. There was shooting, rejoicing, and Uday shouting in the face of 'Kamel Hanna', denounced: "What is the mess?!" And he said: We celebrate on the occasion of lady and the President. Uday threatened him and warned him not to shoot bullets in the air, so it was 'Kamel Hanna' except that he raised his weapon in the air and fired bullets, so Uday's response was a fatal blow to his head with a heavy club that was with him, and he was killed. Saddam imprisoned all his guards and those who were with him, who were 15 individuals, and I was supposed to be with them had it not been for the delay that saved me from prison. They were sentenced to imprisonment, and Uday was exiled from Iraq to Switzerland for a period of six months."

President Hosni Mubarak of Egypt called Uday a "psychopath"

Shooting of Watban Ibrahim 
In 1995, during a fight between his maternal uncle Louay and paternal half uncle Watban, Uday shot his half uncle as well as the other guests at the party. The shooting left six bodyguards dead and Watban seriously injured. Uday then took his half uncle Watban to the hospital and disappeared. Because his brothers-in-law, Hussein Kamel and Saddam Kamel, escaped to Jordan the next day, Uday's attack on his uncle remained in the background. Saddam ordered Uday to ask his uncle to shoot him in the same way as Uday had shot him, but Watban refused to do so. One of the injured at the party said that the reason for the attack was that Uday's half-uncle had mocked Uday's speech disorder and his maternal uncle had told Uday about it. Since birth, Uday's upper jaw has extended forward an abnormally large amount, making it difficult for him to speak clearly. At the ceremony, his uncle had imitated him mockingly. Shortly after the incident, Saddam got angry when he saw his half-brother in the hospital having difficulty walking, and he ordered the garage for Uday's luxury cars to be burned down. Uday was angry with his brother Qusay for not preventing Saddam and had a nervous breakdown. Qusay said he prevented him from burning another garage. Uday set up a barricade in front of his luxury cars in another nearby garage, armed himself with weapons, and waited for his father or his men to come. According to his close friend Jaber, Uday would have killed him if his father had come to the second garage. Abbas Al Janabi said: "The reason why Uday shot Watban was a result of a business conflict between Lu'ayy Khayrallah Tulfa [Sajida's brother; Uday's maternal uncle and his childhood friend] and one of Saddam's other half-brothers, with Watban becoming the victim. Following Uday's shooting of [his uncle] Watban, Saddam tried to confiscate and blow up Uday's cars in one garage. But that garage contained only thirteen cars. Saddam did not know that Uday has several other garages; I know of at least six more."

Murder of Hussein Kamel and Saddam Kamel 
According to the book The Interrogation of Saddam Hussein by John Nixon, Uday provoked the escape of Hussein Kamel al-Majid and Saddam Kamel in 1995. A drunk Uday went to Kamel's house where a party was being held and punched Saddam Kamel. When he was defeated by Kamel, he took out his gun and fired, but accidentally wounded Watban, who got in the way. Shortly after the grooms escaped to Jordan, Saddam burned the garage for Uday's luxury cars, saying, "While Iraqis are suffering from the embargo, this situation may send a false message." Uday took over Iraq's oil sales, previously largely pocketed by the entourage of Hussein Kamel when he oversaw the oil business along with his responsibilities in defense and industry, Uday also zeroed in on other areas that had been the province of Kamel, including army equipment supplies, reconstruction and food imports. An Iraqi official said, "Kamel decided to defect because he became frightened that Uday was now getting strong enough to really take care of him."

Along with many other crimes, he along with Qusay in 1996, was said to be involved in the killings of their brothers-in-law, Hussein Kamel and Saddam Kamel, who themselves were powerful members of the elite regime. The two men, who had defected to Jordan along with their wives and children, were murdered after their return to Iraq.

About the murder, Abbas Al Janabi, said: "The decision to eliminate Husayn Kamil was not decided ahead of time but only after his return to Baghdad. On his return, Husayn Kamil was asked to go to the presidential palace. Saddam asked that both he and his brother divorce their wives (Saddam's daughters), but they both refused. In addition to Uday, Saddam had asked a prominent judge to attend the meeting with Husayn Kamil to prepare the divorce papers. I was at the palace at the time but I stayed outside the meeting room. I waited for 'Uday to leave the room, and he told me the details. After his refusal, Husayn Kamil went to his palace in the Ad-Dura area. The decision to eliminate them took place after their refusal to divorce. The decision to execute Husayn Kamil came from Saddam personally. Saddam had also decided that the execution should be carried out by Husayn Kamil's cousins in the al-Majid clan. It was the duty of Uday, Qusay, and Ali Hasan al-Majid to oversee the executions. Uday was not an initial proponent of his execution. However, after Husayn Kamil refused to divorce Uday's sister, Uday became a supporter of the decision to execute Husayn Kamil and his brother." On that day, Janabi said, "With a loudspeaker, Uday said to him 'You and your brother have to divorce the girls, this is your last chance.' Instead of answering them, Kamel shoot them." The shoot-out lasted 13 hours. Then brothers and their father came out to surrender and they were dumped out. "After they kill him, from a very near distance they shoot him, many bullets in his body. He was just swimming with a lake of blood."

Assassination attempt 
Uday sustained permanent injuries during an assassination attempt while in his Porsche on the evening of 12 December 1996. Struck by between 7 and 17 bullets while driving in Al-Mansour, Baghdad, Uday was initially believed to be paralyzed. Evacuated to Ibn Sina Hospital, he eventually recovered but with a noticeable limp. Despite repeated operations, two bullets remained lodged in his spine and could not be removed due to their location. In the wake of Uday's subsequent disabilities, Saddam gave Qusay increasing responsibility and authority, designating him as his heir apparent in 2000. However, Abbas al-Janabi claimed that Uday's exclusion in the family ended after shooting his step-uncle Watban after this assassination. An American hypnotist from Chicago, Larry Garrett, travelled to Baghdad twice in April and September 2001, where he utilized hypnotism to treat Uday's inability to walk with his left leg and spent over 60 hours of personal time with Uday. Garrett said of Uday, "He was an educated man, with a background in engineering. He was versed in the Koran. He had visited the U.S. with his cousin when he was 17. He expressed some political views, but he didn't involve me in them. I must say I was developing a fondness for him. He never spoke to me as a leader or the son of a leader. He never condescended. It was just two men sitting around at night." He published a book of his experiences with Uday in Iraq, initially titled Healing the enemy: Hypnotic Nights in Baghdad, but later changed to Hypnotizing the Devil: The True Story of a Hypnotist Who Treated the Psychotic Son of Saddam Hussein. He met with Uday on the day of the September 11 attacks, where Uday had great concern for Garrett's safety and told him Iraq would likely be blamed for the attack.

The Shia Shaaban movement assumed responsibility for the assassination attempt. Salman Sharif, one of the four would-be assassins who attacked Uday, learned that he regularly visited one of the luxurious streets of Mansour every Thursday at around 7 in the evening to pick up a girl. They watched the street for three months and made preparations. They realized that Uday was sometimes unprotected and tried to find out which shop owners and workers on the street were part of the secret police, and who were real shopkeepers. On the day of the assassination attempt, they saw a luxury car that could only belong to Uday without bodyguards. They shot Uday exactly 50 times, with 17 hits. Some Shaaban members who knew about this assassination attempt were arrested for another incident in Jordan and handed over to the Iraqi police. In August 1998, Saddam's men arrested Abu Sajad and learned the details of other members of the team. Sharif's seven brothers and father were imprisoned, and his mother was then told to collect their bodies from the Baghdad morgue. The father and three brothers of would-be assassin Abu Sadeq were executed. Abu Sajad and his father shared the same fate. Security guards destroyed the homes of all families with bulldozers and confiscated all their property. Iraqi intelligence eventually traced Abu Sadeq to a location in Iran where he was assassinated on the elder Hussein's orders in December 2002.

Uday never fully recovered from the injuries he sustained during the attack; purportedly walking with a limp for the rest of his life and—according to popular belief—becoming impotent. Sharif interpreted this as "divine justice", referring to Uday's brutal reputation with women.
According to Ala Bashir, the surgeon who operated on Uday, "He was not impotent because the injury was far from the reproductive system." He said that Uday saw the assassination attempt as God's revenge for having shot his uncle in the same leg. He said, "Saddam entered the operating room. He looked at his son with calmness, and if any other person, whatever his strength, saw his son in such a scene, he would've lost his temper, but Saddam did not shook his time, but turned around his son and said to him despite his knowledge Uday was unconscious, 'My son, such things are possible and can be expected for men, but we are right and they are false.' Then he kissed him on his forehead and left. Then he met his son Qusay and said to him, 'My son. These things happen to the men, except for a bullet or a wound with a knife. These are normal matters, but you must prepare yourself for the worst day.' Then he went out." About Uday's personality, Ala Bashir said, "Uday was scary because he was unbalanced and did not care about anyone. He often attacked the leadership and no one stood up to him, so I avoided him and did not come close to him. Uday used to hate me a lot and tried to offend me and caused me a lot of problems, but his father's interest in me was a deterrent in front of him."

Abbas al-Janabi, who had worked with Uday as his secretary for 15 years, claimed that every Iraqi knew that Uday had come to that street on Thursdays and claimed that Uday had become much more brutal after the assassination attempt. He also claimed that Uday was outraged by the rumors that he was impotent after the assassination attempt and ordered the secret police to make up stories about his virility. Janabi said, "Uday is a sadist, a monster. I saw how he laughed when someone was whipped." He also claimed that he witnessed dozens of rapes. He said that what makes Uday sexually excited was violence: "This is his nature, rape is like a hobby for him, and believe me, I know what I am talking about and I am not exaggerating." Janabi said, "I saw how he tortured people, how he laughed, how he enjoyed it, you can't control him, he is a kind of maniac, he is a psychologically imbalanced person." He said that Uday never kept friends around for long because he enjoyed scaring them. Uday didn't think that it was clean for his dogs to retrieve the birds he shot, so he would force his friends to act as retrievers when he went hunting. He said that Uday neutralized women who refused him with alcohol and drugs, raped them, recorded it, and if the victim's family was important, he terrorized the family by blackmail. He said that Uday even started to look at 12-year-old girls after he was 30 years old. Unlike their fathers, he said that Uday and Qusay are not the type of people to surrender.

Ala Bashir claimed that Uday had sustained brain damage due to low blood pressure after the assassination attempt, but doctors could not report this damage to Saddam. Again, according to Bashir, on the day of the incident, Ali Al Sahar, the brother of singer Kadim El Sahar, was with Uday, and the attempt was made on Uday's life when Ali got out of the car to give Uday's phone number to some girls that Uday liked. Ali immediately took Uday to the hospital. Qusay told his father that the incident happened when Uday went to buy food to break his fasting, but Saddam said to Ali, "I know you were going to pick up girls there." Earlier it was claimed that Uday was jealous of singer Kadim Al Sahar because of his fame in Iraq and Kadim had to leave Iraq because of his threats. Abbas Al Janabi said: "The interesting point here is that the person who saved Uday's life by driving him to the hospital, the singer Ali as-Sahir, received a death threat from Saddam personally in front of others. I was waiting outside the hospital with Qusay when Saddam arrived in a helicopter. He asked for Ali as-Sahir, who was brought to him. In front of us, Saddam told him: 'If anything happens to Uday, I will cut you in pieces.' Saddam thought that Sahir was behind the attempt."

After the assassination attempt, Uday said to the press: "I feel fine. I'm recovering. I feel like any leader of a team would feel if he had been betrayed. I feel that what has happened is not man's work. (meaning this was a cowardly act) God bless the Iraqi people. God save Iraq. God save Saddam." Later, Uday told CNN his wounds are a source of pride and honor. He cited a family history of wounds acquired in battle, ending with his father, wounded in an operation "for the party" in 1959. "And now this has happened to me," he said. "The attack was nothing unusual. It could happen any time, because we are surrounded by countries, some of whom are hostile," none more so than Iran, he said. "Time has proved that Iran is involved in such incidents. Incidents such as this have occurred throughout the region, not just in Iraq." He warned that Iran is growing in power, saying it is "not in the interests of the United States to increase hostility and hatred in the region."

Rape and Torture of Women and Children 
In 1987, Uday raped the 15-year-old daughter of his father’s mistress Shaqraa, a Greek-Lebanese former pageant holder who was the daughter of an oil businessman.  When Saddam was informed of what happened, after several hours, Uday was put in prison but released after a short period. Because the woman had not kept silent about the rape, Uday's bodyguards tortured her with electric batons with Uday present.

In 2000, two French university students claimed that they were invited by Uday to a party in Baghdad, but as soon as they entered the room, they were forced to have sex with each other at gunpoint while it was recorded by camera. In 1999, an anti-embargo group of French volunteers went to Iraq and a woman was forced to stay with Uday after the party, but they were able to leave the party when one of the women said "we did not come here to be prostitutes". Miss Germany, Alexandra Vodjanikova, met with Uday and said "he was charming, downright warm, very friendly and always said to her 'you are beautiful, you are sexy'".

One of his former classmates, Aziz Al-Taee, said:  Zainab Salbi, daughter of Saddam Hussein's private pilot said, "The days when Uday came to the university, the girls were hiding in the toilet in fear to escape from his hungry eyes, but it is a known fact that nobody can escape from the lust of Uday and Uday is known for his eerie quietness than for wild craziness." One of his long-time employees, Khaled Jassem, said: 

According to a former employee, Uday would party five nights a week and fast for the remaining two days. The chief of the Baghdad Hunting Club claimed that after a wedding party in the late 1990s, the bride suddenly disappeared, Uday's bodyguards locked all the doors, and the groom committed suicide. Again, according to the allegations of Uday's servant, he witnessed forced custody of a crying bride at home in October 2002 and later said that the girl was killed and her body was destroyed after she was raped. When the city was about to fall to US-led forces, it was alleged that Uday ordered Fedayeen Saddam to burn his cars instead of letting others take their cars. Former business manager Adib Shabaan said that Uday burned the hips of many women with whom he had sex with a horseshoe, creating a U-shaped scar. Ala Bashir, the doctor of the Saddam family, claimed that he was treating women who were in the same condition and who had been burned with a lighted cigarette by Uday.

Adeeb al-Ani, who was Uday's secretary, said,  Uday's assistant, Adib Shabaan, said: "In 1998, Uday saw an ex-governor's 14-year-old daughter at a party, had her kidnapped, sent her home after three days, and when the girl's father was informed about the rape and talked about what happened, Uday told the man, 'Your daughters will be my girlfriends, or I will erase you from the earth,' and ordered the man to bring his daughter and his other 12-year-old daughter to his next party." According to a former employee, "Five nights a week, two dozen girls, all brought to him by his friends, were taken to the luxurious Baghdad Boat Club on the Tigris coast to meet Uday; those who were chosen after drinks, music, and dance would spend the night with Uday". "He never slept with a girl more than three times," said an ex-butler. If a friend used the same brand of clothes, perfumes, or shoes as Uday, Uday would threaten his friend not to use the same thing again. A family friend said that the day Uday discovered the Internet was "a black day for the Iraqis", and he had employees whose job was to investigate new methods of torture and new car models on the Internet. In the Boat Club's kitchen there was a monkey named Louisa, and if one of Uday's friends fell asleep at parties because of alcohol, he would put them in the same cage with the drunk monkey.

According to one of Uday's close circle, "If the girl he chose did not want Uday, if she found another boyfriend or was late or reluctant, she would have to dance after getting her feet whipped." Again, according to a friend's claim, Uday would make fun of the girls who lost their virginity because he knew that no one would touch them later and would say, "She will have to be a prostitute from now on." Again, one of his employees said, "He had a secretary hunting the girls – in universities, ministries. They even had a bedroom in the Olympic offices for women brought to him. They generally agreed to sleep with him. They had no other choice."

He had allegations against him as recently as early March 2003, shortly before the invasion, when a 13-year-old girl said she accompanied her older sister to Jadriea Equestrian Club, which he frequented. She alleged that she was taken by his bouncers to a back room and raped by him, in which she was given 250,000 dinars (about $200).

Body double allegations 
In his memoir, I was Saddam's Son, Uday's alleged body double Latif Yahia said that he witnessed rapes, killings and torture by Uday Hussein. Yahia claimed that in 1987, he was forced to be Uday’s body double, even going through plastic surgery to resemble him more. According to Yahia, Uday raped a little Palestinian girl who was selling flowers in the Al-Rashid Hotel, and later raped and murdered a little deaf girl in Nineveh. Uday also ordered the kidnapping of Ilham Ali al-Aazami, Miss Iraq, after she had rejected him. Uday and his bodyguards subsequently held her captive and raped her for weeks, and started the rumor that she was a prostitute, causing her to be killed by her father. When the father confronted Uday the latter spoke disparagingly about the girl, causing the father to lose control to the point of first verbally accosting and ultimately physically assailing Uday. This prompted Uday to order Latif to shoot the rather than acquiesce, Latif instead refused and attempted to commit suicide. Ultimately the father was murdered by one of Uday's bodyguards. On another occasion, Uday attacked a newlywed couple and raped the bride in the al-Medina Hotel. She then committed suicide by throwing herself off the balcony. Her husband, a lieutenant, was later killed for "insulting the president".

Irish Times journalist Eoin Butler and Sunday Times journalist Ed Caesar have questioned Yahia's various claims, including that he was Uday Hussein's body double, and pointed out that many of Yahia's activities since leaving Iraq in 1992, including his education, have not been verified.  Individuals close to Yahia and Hussein denied that the former was the latter's body-double, or denied that Hussein had even had a body double. Yahia disputes these claims, saying that his very existence was a state secret.

Partying 
Uday was known for forcing guests to drink large quantities of alcohol at his parties. According to a friend, whoever earned Uday's friendship had to drink a cocktail named the "Uday Saddam Hussein", a mixture of whiskey, brandy, vodka, cognac, and beer. The cocktail was served in a large "cup of friendship", and the new friend had to drink it all. Uday had employees whose job was to make people and especially singers drink cocktails containing 90% alcohol, sometimes including drugs. The guard would line up all the entertainment against the wall and give them 10 minutes to drink. Those who did not drink despite the threats were punished in three ways; having their hair and eyebrows shaven off, being beaten enough to stand up without touching their faces, and being subjected to a foot whipping before being forced to walk. Often, the tortures were done in front of Uday's eyes. If the bodyguards did not do this, or when asked to answer correctly who was drinking and who did not, they would receive the same punishment. The bodyguards alleged that they tortured people in this way twice a week and at least 100 people a year. "When Uday wanted for a car, no one could stop him," one of his employees said. His employees claimed that they were also tortured by Uday or on Uday's orders. A source claimed that he killed his friend after forcing him to drink large quantities of alcohol, and this is not the first time that Uday has killed those close to him in this way.

Ismail Hussain, who worked as a singer at Uday's parties in the early 1990s, said "Uday did not need a reason to party. He would have food and drink tables while many people in Iraq were starving. He'd get drunk and dance—he was a good dancer too. Later, he'd bring out the machine guns and start shooting them off. He'd point the guns right over my head, and the bullets would spray all over the place. I would sing right through the flying bullets. I couldn't hear the music anymore. I'd just keep going, because I couldn't stop. It ended when Uday was ready for it to end. At the parties, there would be about five or six men and 40 or 50 women. He was moody. People were expendable." He said, "I would be performing, and Uday would climb up on the stage with a machine gun and start shooting it at the ceiling. Uday would insist that everyone get drunk with him. He would interrupt my performance, get up on stage with a big glass of cognac for himself and one for me. He would insist that I drink all of it with him. When he gets really drunk, out come the guns. His friends are all terrified of him, because he can have them imprisoned or killed. I saw him once get angry with one of his friends. He kicked the man in the ass so hard that his boot flew off. The man ran over and retrieved the boot and then tried to put it back on Uday's foot, with Uday cursing him all the while."

Singer Qasım Sultan was called to the Hunting Club in 1997 after singing at private parties in the United States and returning to Baghdad. Uday ordered him to sing until the sun rose. At 8:00a.m., Uday began shouting at Sultan, scolded him for returning to Baghdad without telling him and told his guards to beat him. When Sultan went to another midnight concert by Uday, Uday's bodyguards beat him for not arriving earlier. Before Sultan came on the stage, he was called by Uday to drink his "mysterious cocktail", a mixture of beer, gin and other hard liquors. Sultan was hospitalized twice because of the amount of alcohol he was forced to drink at these parties. He also claimed that in 1997, after the assassination attempt, in the garden of Uday's palace, he was forced to sing among the lions. He described the parties as "a place where armed cowboys can kill you at any time." After Al-Shabab was founded in 1993, Iraqi singers of the 70s and 80s, such as Fadel Awad, Saadoun Jaber and Riyadh Ahmed were banned by Uday, on the grounds that they were the singers of the previous generation. Uday said to them, "You are forbidden from singing and I do not want to hear that any of you sings at a party." The ban was issued, their songs were not shown on TV, they did not perform any concert, and did not record a song for TV. However, Singer Ali Al-Issawi said, "Uday was a fan of singing and a connoisseur and he listened to all the singers and enjoyed our songs. Uday did not punish anyone at that time, but he only held accountable the abusive artists. He used to meet with me two to three times during the same day and did not harm me or my group at all."

Other ventures 
Uday founded his own sports club called Al-Rasheed and signed all the best players from the country to play for the club. They went on to dominate Iraqi football until the team was dissolved in 1990. He also became the editor of the Babel newspaper, the general secretary of the Iraqi Union of Students and the head of the Fedayeen Saddam, as well as the head of the Iraq Journalists Union. His newspaper, Babel, was known for carrying Western reports on Iraq's conflict with the United States and was said to be the most influential newspaper in the country. Uday also had a television channel, Youth TV (Al-Shabab), which aired reports by other Arab channels not usually heard on Iraq's state-run media. Uday used his media empire to discredit people who got in his way. Iraq's most popular radio station was Voice of Youth, owned by Uday, the only radio station that played Western music. Uday seemed proud of his reputation and called himself Abu Sarhan, an Arabic term for "wolf".

Uday also ran a food processing business called Super Chicken, which reportedly earned him millions of dollars, and an ice cream company called the Wave.

Uday was responsible for nearly 20 American prisoners of war captured during the 1991 Gulf War, including ex-Navy Commander Jeff Zaun, forced to appear on Iraqi state television and forced to condemn their country after being tortured.

Saad al-Bazzaz, who was the editor-in-chief of Uday's newspapers and state television, said, "In an editorial meeting, Uday got angry at an article in my newspaper and took out his gun. You could imagine our reaction when he started playing with the gold-plated Kalashnikov while yelling at us. After that, any kind of dialogue with him was impossible. When Uday took over most of the media, the situation in Iraq got worse. This man had nothing to do with journalism, but he saw that media is a powerful way to try to control the minds of the Iraqi people. He knew very well that many journalists did not support his father. Many people worked against the regime at night. Some were beaten and executed. Others were killed or fled the country, leaving their families vulnerable to Uday's bloody revenge retaliation."

Dhafer Muhammad Jaber Siddiq, one of Uday's closest aides, said about Uday: "He used to criticize his father's policies on many occasions, directly or indirectly, especially when discussing with Hussein Kamel... Uday was a young man like many young men trying to get close to beautiful women. He would send his phone number to every young woman he liked. There were a lot of women who were trying to get to know Uday, some of them changed their minds, and some of them strengthened their relationship with him...He was a person with many contradictions. For example, after the killing of his uncle, Minister of Defense Adnan Khairallah in 1989, he started to pray regularly and never cut it, and he fasted every Monday and Thursday, but he used to drink alcohol continuously. He was generous at times to the extreme, but at other times, he became unimaginably stingy. He had his independent empire. He used to say it himself, he used to say that he possessed the foundations of a state. He had press, television, sports, military and trade." Uday got a lawyer shot after he raised the case of a 17-year-old girl who was kidnapped and was rumored to be at Uday's Iraqi Olympic Committee compound. According to the lawyer's testimony, "Uday was looking at the papers I carried for him and then said: I will break both of your legs so that you cannot come back again, but I see your left leg was injured during the war with Iran, so I will break your right leg." One of Uday's men then shot the right leg of the lawyer, and had him thrown off near a hospital. As for the girl, she was finally sent to her home after being raped repeatedly and asked her family not to travel. However, she managed to escape to Poland, where some of her relatives lived. But after a few years, some of the killers working for Uday were able to track down the girl and they killed her along with her father, the lawyer said. Some of the waiters working in high-end clubs said that they would shrink with terror whenever Uday arrived, drunk and armed, looking for women to kidnap. A lawyer said that Uday had ordered the head of a beautiful TV presenter to be shaved so that he could keep her long strands and then kept her naked in the Olympic Committee building for a month because she opposed his request.

Muhammad Asim Shanshal, head of the private office of Uday, said, "Uday by providing all the possibilities and needs for poors, as he allocated about 40% of the Olympic Committee's revenues as the head of the Olympic Committee, as he was coordinating with the rest of the ministries to allocate 20% of each ministry to poor families... They were spreading these rape rumours to discredit him, so it was not because Uday forced any girl to engage in obscenity, but we must note that any young man in any country has certain relationships and whims. He was a young man who had connections, and he was loved by everyone, and everyone wished to accompany him, but he was a smart person, as he knew very well and with an understanding of how to identify friends. Uday used to provide everything necessary for the players from homes, cars and all means of rest and decent living. But everything that happened if any player made a mistake was reprimanded by Uday, so if the player kept repeating mistakes, he had to be punished. The penalty was to stop him from playing and not participate in the team, until he regained consciousness, and apologized, and if the player insisted on the mistake, his punishment was severe, refer to legal matter. Uday was bloody fierce in the moment only, and after he laughed and loved fun."

In the last years of the regime, the Fedayen Saddam troops led by Uday cut the heads of 30 prostitutes and threw them in front of their homes. A member of a guerrilla group whose duties were mainly special operations of Saddam's Fedayeen said that they assassinated figures opposed to the regime, shattering the appearance of those who were accused of hiding the truth from the government. He said, "If Uday said, cut his tongue, hands, fingers, or head, or anything, we do that. As for the penalties that do not amount to death, they were executed according to a specific system, those who steal cut their fingers and hands. Those who lie, throw heavy stones on their backs, while informants who transmit incorrect information, put hot irons in their mouths, and those who evade the army, cut their ears." When Uday wanted to kill someone, he sent a group equipped with ten photographs of the target. The process would be recorded with video or audio to demonstrate that it was carried out and Uday would maintain a set of these videotapes.

Financial and property interests 
It has been claimed that Uday had taken advantage of the United Nations sanctions in Iraq and built an immense wealth and influence empire. He supplied oil, cigarettes and other prohibited materials through smuggling and sold them on the black market in Iraq. He also sold alcohol and racehorses to rich Gulf countries. He opened accounts with Yahoo! and MSN Messenger, which created controversy as this allegedly violated U.S. trade sanctions against Iraq. Uday also amassed a large video collection, found in his palace in 2003, much of which featured himself in both public and private situations. In Uday's palace, a zoo with wild animals, hundreds of luxury cars, guns made from many brands of gold, hundreds of luxury alcohol brands, and hundreds of cigars with the name on it were found. At the Presidential Palace, in Uday's dwellings, anti-depressants, an e-mail output that "a virgin girl agrees to come to him," and another order asking for the girls to be examined for diseases were found. One of Uday's private prisons was later disclosed, and it was stated that there were everyone who bothered Uday inside, the insiders were businessmen clashing with Uday, athletes who could not win, drivers who did not yield him the right of way, and some were thrown into the same cell with German shepherd dogs and left to die. Erotic pictures of women downloaded from the internet and pictures of American president Bush's twin daughters Jenna and Barbara were found on the walls in the gym of Uday. In another house owned by Uday, "pornographic pictures, heroin bags, expensive liqueurs, vintage cars and HIV testing" was found. He was feeding lions and the other wild animals in his palace and often fed them with his own hands.

Abbas Al Janabi said: "He has a large number of cars. He stole around 160 cars from Kuwait. You may not believe it when I tell you that 'Uday has 1,300 luxury cars, such as Rolls Royces, Porsches, Ferraris, Range Rovers, Lincolns and others. Uday has prisons everywhere you go. He has two prisons in the presidential palace, a prison in the armory, a prison in the Olympic Committee, and a prison at his farm in the Radhwaniya compound." About his business, he said: "He controls many facets of smuggling in Iraq—whisky, tobacco, fertilizers, petrol, and other goods. His business interests extend to Turkey, Iran, and Jordan. He has also gained control of all aid going to Iraq from the United Arab Emirates. He stores this aid in warehouses owned by the Olympic Committee and only distributes a small portion of it, always in front of the press. Uday then arranges for this aid to be sold in stores, and gets the proceeds. Uday is also one of the parties who controls the U.S. dollar/dinar exchange rate and the smuggling of dollars overseas. Because of the large number of U.S. dollars he has, he can affect the movement of the exchange rate at any given time to the benefit of his commercial operations."

Personal life 

Personal accounts state Uday grew up idolizing his father, Saddam Hussein, although their relationship later became strained due to his father's many mistresses. Uday maintained a close cordial relationship with his mother, Sajida Talfah. The otherwise apathetic Uday, at his uncle Adnan Khairallah's funeral in 1989, showed a rare moment of tenderness.

Uday married 3 times. In 1983, his father arranged for him to marry Nada, the daughter of Ali Hassan al-Majid. They had 2 sons but later divorced. While banished in Geneva, he married Saha, the daughter of his father’s half brother Barzan Ibrahim al-Tikriti in July 1993 in an arranged marriage set by his father.  She was a teenager when she married him. The marriage was never consummated and she deserted him 3 months later after she accused him of beating her during their marriage. She wrote a letter to him in 1996 professing her love despite this. He later married Suja, the daughter of Izzat Ibrahim ad-Douri, who had a son with him, although she alleged that he treated her badly.

After being handicapped by the assassination attempt on him in 1996, he maintained distance from Qusay who was rising in ranks and thought to be Saddam's next legitimate successor. Uday was 6feet 6inches tall and athletically built, though after the assassination attempt, he was partially paralyzed and would eventually use a wheelchair in private and a cane in public.

His longtime secretary Abbas al Janabi said:  About the relationship with his brothers Janabi said in 1999: "Saddam has one son, Ali, from Samira Shahbandar. He is thirteen years old. He is a member of the board of an athletic club. He is treated in a special manner by his father, with many servants and bodyguards. The press does not focus on Ali because Uday does not want him to have any public role. Even though he is a director of the largest athletic club in Baghdad, Uday refuses to have any publicity surrounding his role. Uday hates him. Uday cannot tolerate his [younger full] brother Qusay, let alone Ali." About his personality, he said: "Uday was a complex personality. It has to do with his upbringing. Saddam personally took charge of bringing up his younger brother Qusay. Although Saddam also participated in bringing up Uday, he did not devote so much attention to him. It was Uday's mother and her father [Khayrallah Tulfa, Saddam's maternal uncle] who had the most influence on him. This is why we see Khayrallah Tulfa's known traits in Uday, such as the love of money, the love for taking over other people's property, violence and extremism. Uday obviously has some of his father's traits as well, but it is his maternal grandfather that seems to have influenced him as well."

In a sign of loyalty to Saddam, the vice president of the Revolutionary Command Council Izzat al-Douri consented to marry his daughter Hawazin to Uday. However, al-Douri's influence with Saddam was so substantial that he was able to levy a condition: that the union would not be consummated. Because of Uday's violent and erratic behavior, al-Douri quickly petitioned that his daughter be permitted to divorce Uday. Uday reportedly had no children from his marriage. His second marriage was with Saja al-Tikriti, daughter of his step-uncle Barzan İbrahim al-Tikriti; that marriage soon ended as well, beginning with Saja's refusal to return to Iraq after going to Switzerland. Brother of Saja said about the reason of divorce, "Uday did not beat my sister black and blue but treated her like a princess. My sister was only 16, and had different ideas about marriage. That's why they separated soon after the wedding." Dr. Ala Bashir said:"Four days after the wedding, Uday was accompanied by a number of prostitutes in a suite at the Rasheed Hotel, which led to a new scandal in Baghdad. Saja went out to Sajida's house because her parents were in Geneva and tried unsuccessfully to persuade her uncle to agree to divorce her, but the president refused and asked her to talk to Uday about that. Uday refused to talk about the issue of divorce and told her: 'Our family does not know about divorce.'" It was alleged that Uday's third marriage was to the daughter of Saddam's cousin Ali Hassan al-Majid. A Turkish woman named Sevim Torun claimed that she was married to Uday and had a son named Mesut Uday and published her memoir Saddam's Bride.

Uday was reported to have converted to Shia Islam from Sunni Islam in 2001, but he denied these reports.

Allegations of crimes 
In November 1987, Latif said, "I saw many rapes. He raped and killed women, and then killed her parents if they complained. I witnessed many murders. Uday had raped one of the Baghdad Beauty Queens and her father complained to Saddam. He ordered me to kill him. I refused and instead cut my wrists."

A report released on 20 March 2003, one day after the American led invasion of Iraq, by ABC News detailed several allegations against Uday:
 As head of the Iraqi Olympic Committee, Uday oversaw the imprisonment and torture of Iraqi athletes who were deemed not to have performed to expectations. He would insult athletes who performed below his expectations by calling them dogs and monkeys to their faces. One defector reported that imprisoned football players were forced to kick a concrete ball after failing to reach the 1994 FIFA World Cup finals. The Iraqi national football team were seen with their heads shaved after failing to achieve a good result in a tournament in the 1980s. Another defector claimed that athletes were dragged through a gravel pit and then immersed in a sewage tank to induce infection in their wounds. After Iraq lost 4–1 to Japan in the quarter finals of the 2000 AFC Asian Cup in Lebanon, goalkeeper Hashim Khamis, defender Abdul-Jabar Hashim and forward Qahtan Chathir were labelled as guilty of loss and eventually flogged for three days by Uday's security.

Other allegations include:

 Uday was known to intrude on parties and otherwise "discover" women whom he would later rape. Time published an article in 2003 detailing his sexual brutality.
 Usage of an iron maiden on persons who fell foul of him.
 Beating an army officer unconscious when the man refused to allow Uday to dance with his wife; the man later died of his injuries. Uday also shot and killed an army officer who did not salute him.
 Stealing approximately 1,200 luxury vehicles, including a Rolls-Royce Corniche valued at over $200,000.
 Plotting, in 2000, to assassinate Ahmed Chalabi, the leader of the Iraqi National Congress. This was done shortly after Saddam named his younger son, Qusay, heir-apparent to the Presidency. Uday allegedly intended to curry favour with his father through the assassination.

Statements before 2003 

In July 2002, the Iraqi newspaper Babel, owned by Uday Hussein, published an article by "Abu Hatim" (one of the aliases with which Uday signed his political analyses) which claimed that the American administration was planning to strike Iraq and exert political control in the Middle East. It stated the plans "will extend to include everything", "starting from making Jordan an alternative homeland for the Palestinians, "dividing Saudi Arabia into at least three parts and obliterating Bahrain's identity by returning it as part of Persia.

In September 2002, Uday threatened that "the heads of the Americans, the British and others will fly if they try to approach the borders of Iraq, with the aim of invading it." During his meeting with a number of delegations of Arab youth, he said that the Americans who are now allied with them are "Saddam Hussein and his family." He added, "This is the pride of the family. Uday and Qusay went, and that is God's will ... In any case, that is better than targeting the infrastructure and sabotaging the electricity, water, communications and other networks. Uday considered that the undeclared goal of the American war against Iraq is to control Iraq's oil and reserves, which he said is "number one in the world, and they do not say it until they do not say that the war is for oil." He added that the last barrel of oil "on the face of the Earth ... will be a barrel of Iraqi oil." "They (the Americans) separated the (Iraqi) north in this damned way, because the north has uranium, gold and other materials in it," he said. Uday responded to the accusations of British Prime Minister Tony Blair against Iraq, that the latter "if his hands and feet were wrapped and put on a bear, he would have nodded evil with his head, and even if he put his head between the jaws of iron and wood pincers and squeezed the head between the jaws of the pincers, his eyes would still move and gesture to evil." Uday stressed the "strength" of the home front, and that "the enemy will meet what it does, if he tries to harm Iraq."

Killing 

Saddam Hussein's closest aide and personal secretary, Abid Hamid Mahmud, had been captured, and told his interrogators that he and Saddam's two sons had sought refuge in Syria but were turned back. According to the smuggler who took them across the border, they came again after less than 48 hours. They said to the smuggler: "A Syrian citizen will be waiting for a call from them and my mission is limited to bring them to the borders, not inside Syria." The smuggler said, "They sought refuge with some of their acquaintances near the Rabia border center, and they already reached the outskirts of the city of Aleppo, and there, after replacing the broken tires of their car, the Syrian authorities, who ordered their return to Iraq, stopped them. Abd Hammoud was not staying with them, but he visited them for four days and on the fourth day they left the house. Accompanying Abid Hamid towards Mosul, there Uday and Qusay took refuge in the house of Nawaf Al-Zaidan, joined by Mustafa Qusay, who was staying with his grandfather, Maher Abdul-Rashid. On 16 July 2003, he met with Qusay again, asked if he had an intention to get out of Iraq, to which Qusay replied, 'This is no longer possible. I will stay in Iraq awaiting the instructions of the father.' During their time at the villa, the sheikh reportedly left Uday and Qusay playing video games for weeks. Seven days later, Uday, Qusay, Qusay's 14-year-old son Mustafa, and their companion Abdul-Samad were killed." Abdul Halim Khaddam, the former vice president of Syria, revealed that his country handed over the half brother of Saddam Hussein to the American forces. They also deported the sons of the ousted president to Iraq and refused to receive the former foreign minister, Tariq Aziz.

On the night of Monday 21 July 2003, Nawaf al-Zaidan, who had been sheltering Uday, Qusay, Mustafa and their bodyguard Abdul-Samad in his mansion in the Falah neighbourhood of northeastern Mosul, left the villa after tipping the brothers off and went to a nearby 101st Airborne base to turn in the two sons due to the combined $30 million reward. "He was nervous, I could tell, more nervous than anybody else I've seen dealing with it. Yet he had confidence in what he said. More than most of the other people," the 23-year-old American military intelligence sergeant who interviewed al-Zaidan told 60 Minutes II. "He had exact locations. He also could tell very good descriptions on Qusay and Uday as well, their habits. He told me what exactly they looked like." Al-Zaidan then passed a lie detector test, which was interpreted as a definitive validation of his story.

On the morning of Tuesday 22 July 2003, JSOC Task Force 20, aided by troops of the United States Army 101st Airborne Division, surrounded Uday, Qusay, and Qusay's 14-year-old son Mustafa during a raid on a home in the northern Iraqi city of Mosul. Uday had been the Ace of Hearts on the most-wanted Iraqi playing cards (Qusay was the Ace of Clubs). Acting on a tip from al-Zaidan, soldiers from the 101st Airborne Division provided security while the Task Force 20 operators tried to capture the inhabitants of the house. As many as 200 American troops, later aided by OH-58 Kiowa helicopters, surrounded and fired upon the house, thus killing Uday, Qusay, and Qusay's son. After approximately four hours of battle, soldiers entered the house and found four bodies, including the Hussein brothers' bodyguard.

Soldiers, who tried to enter the house three times, encountered resistance with AK-47 and grenades in the first two attempts. Uday, Qusay and guard took up positions in a bathroom at the front of the building, where they had a line of fire on the streets and on steps leading up to the first floor; Qusay's son took cover in the bedroom in the back and defended themselves. The American forces then bombed the house many times and fired missiles. The three adults were thought to have died from a TOW missile fired into the front of the house. In the third attempt, the soldiers killed Mustafa after he fired. Mustafa had been the last one to die in the four-hour siege and kept shooting even after Qusay and Uday had been killed, US military officials said.

Brigade commander Colonel Joe Anderson said an Arabic announcement was made at 10:00a.m. on the day and called on people inside to come out peacefully. The answer he received was bullet bombardment. An experienced team of special forces tried to attack the building, but they had to retreat under fire. Four American soldiers were injured. Anderson then ordered his men to fire with 50-caliber heavy machine guns. Uday and Qusay refused to surrender even after a helicopter fired a rocket and the Strike Brigade fired 40 mm grenades at them. Anderson decided that more firepower was necessary to take down the brothers, leading to 12 TOW missiles being fired into the building.

Later, the American command said that dental records had conclusively identified two of the dead men as Saddam Hussein's sons. They also announced that the informant would receive the combined $30 million reward previously offered for their apprehension.

According to Saddam Hussein's memories, when he learned about the death of his sons and grandson, the first thing he said was, "Did they fight?" When he got the answer "Yes", then he said, "Good! Praise be to God, who honored me with their martyrdom and defense of their homeland."
After his sons' deaths, Saddam Hussein recorded a tape and said,  During Saddam's interrogation, when George Piro started asking questions about Uday, Piro said, "I was surprised. He didn't show any remorse (about his son's death). He told me that he was, of course, proud of his sons. They died believing, or fighting, for what they believed. I pressed him until Saddam didn't want to hear anymore (the rumors about Uday). He tells me to stop. Basically stop asking these questions. You don't get to pick your kids. You're kind of stuck with what you get." During a different interrogation, when CIA analyst John Nixon confronted Saddam with the rumor that he and Samira had a son named Ali, Saddam painfully said, "If I told you yes, would you kill him like you killed Uday and Qusay?" Saddam also told Nixon he had learned of his sons' deaths through BBC radio.

Newsweek claimed that the contents of Uday Hussein's briefcase consisted of Viagra, numerous bottles of cologne, unopened packages of men's underwear, dress shirts, a silk tie and a single condom. The money found with the former Iraqi leader's sons was more than three times the $30 million bounty on their heads by the US Government. They had about $100 million in Iraqi dinars and US dollars. Some claimed Nawaf al-Zaidan, who owned the villa where the men were hiding, had tipped off the Americans to their presence after reportedly sheltering them for 23 days.
The others claimed that Uday and Qusay were tracked down after Uday made a telephone call to an associate that was tracked by the US Central Intelligence Agency. Then the brother of Nawaf, Salah al-Zidani, was shot dead by gunmen while Nawaf was thought to have fled Iraq. According to a former bodyguard for Uday Hussein, after the fall of Baghdad, they planned a guerrilla resistance and Saddam and his sons lived separately in Baghdad after the American occupation, changing houses every two or three days. But Uday continued to drive through the city in nondescript vehicles, and always with a machine pistol, according to the bodyguard. He said Saddam and his sons had been moving freely around Baghdad, often with astonishingly little effort to hide themselves during the war.
At one stage, Uday had driven past a convoy of US soldiers, looking at their faces and quietly insulting the men who now controlled his country. During the war, Uday forsook the alcohol and womanising and concentrated his energies on directing the Fedayeen Saddam.

The U.S. Administration released graphic pictures of the Hussein brothers' bodies. Both brothers had grown long beards to avoid detection, with Uday shaving his head. Afterwards, their bodies were reconstructed by morticians to assure the public that they were deceased. For example, Uday's beard was trimmed and an 8-inch metal bar in his leg from the 1996 assassination attempt was removed. When criticized, the U.S. military's response was to point out that these men were no ordinary combatants, and to express hope that confirmation of the deaths would bring closure to the Iraqi people. Uday was buried in a cemetery in his hometown of Al-Awja near Tikrit, alongside Qusay and Mustafa. In 2017, his son Massoud claimed that the Iranian government stole his body although this was unproven.

In film, television, and theatre 
Philip Arditti portrayed Uday in the miniseries House of Saddam. He and Latif were portrayed by Dominic Cooper in The Devil's Double, based on Latif's memoirs, "I was Saddam's Son", but according to Latif had only been "20% of the truth". Hrach Titizian portrayed him in the play Bengal Tiger at the Baghdad Zoo. Sam Vincenti portrayed him in the Locked Up Abroad TV-series, in the 2013 episode "Son of Saddam".

References

External links 
 

1964 births
2003 deaths
Tulfah family
Arab Socialist Ba'ath Party – Iraq Region politicians
Iraqi murderers
Iraqi rapists
Deaths by firearm in Iraq
Sons of national leaders
Iraqi football chairmen and investors
Iraqi military personnel killed in action
Military personnel killed in action in the Iraq War
Iraqi Sunni Muslims
Iraqi Arab nationalists
20th-century Iraqi politicians
21st-century Iraqi politicians
Assassinated Iraqi politicians
Assassinations in Iraq
Most-wanted Iraqi playing cards